Edward Rhodes (9 May 1934 – 16 December 2003) was a British television script editor.  His best known work was as script editor on the BBC series All Creatures Great and Small, for which he worked on 42 of the series 90 episodes. He also worked as a writer for The Avengers (1963). He was previously an actor.

Rhodes was killed during a confrontation with a cyclist in Wimbledon, London, in 2003. He was 69.

"I couldn't have done any of it without Ted Rhodes. He was marvellous," said Bill Sellars, producer of All Creatures. "He was a brilliant script editor. He spent his lifetime as a script editor and he had so many ideas. He knew how to put a script together. He knew what the beginning was, he knew the middle and he knew the end, and he could really weave those together to create one whole. They were never disjointed."

References

External links

1934 births
2003 deaths
BBC people
English television writers
English male television actors
People from Blackpool
British male television writers
20th-century English screenwriters